Marcus Xavier McCauley, Jr. (born September 3, 1983) is a former American football cornerback. He was drafted by the Minnesota Vikings in the third round of the 2007 NFL Draft. He played college football at Fresno State.

McCauley was also a member of the Detroit Lions, Tampa Bay Buccaneers, New Orleans Saints, Washington Redskins, Indianapolis Colts and Sacramento Mountain Lions.

College career
McCauley played his college football for the Fresno State Bulldogs. During his career he played in 51 games starting 32 and was Named 2nd-Team All-Western Athletic Conference during his junior season.

Professional career

Minnesota Vikings
McCauley was drafted by the Minnesota Vikings in the third round of the 2007 NFL Draft. During his rookie season, he started nine games, recording 64 tackles. He was waived during final cuts on September 5, 2009.

Detroit Lions
McCauley was claimed off waivers by the Detroit Lions on September 6, 2009. He was waived on September 29.

Tampa Bay Buccaneers
McCauley was signed by the Tampa Bay Buccaneers on October 20. He was waived on November 3.

New Orleans Saints
McCauley was signed by the New Orleans Saints on December 8. He was waived on December 22 when the team signed safety Herana-Daze Jones.

Washington Redskins
McCauley was signed by the Washington Redskins on December 30, 2009.  He was released on June 9, 2010.

Sacramento Mountain Lions
McCauley was signed by the Sacramento Mountain Lions of the United Football League on October 18, 2010.

External links
Just Sports Stats
Fresno State Bulldogs bio
Indianapolis Colts bio

1983 births
Living people
Players of American football from Sacramento, California
American football cornerbacks
Fresno State Bulldogs football players
Minnesota Vikings players
Detroit Lions players
Tampa Bay Buccaneers players
New Orleans Saints players
Washington Redskins players
Indianapolis Colts players
Sacramento Mountain Lions players